

Events

January–March 
 January 2 – The first photograph of the Moon is taken, by French photographer Louis Daguerre.
 January 6 – Night of the Big Wind: Ireland is struck by the most damaging cyclone in 300 years.
 January 9 – The French Academy of Sciences announces the daguerreotype photography process.
 January 19 – British forces capture Aden.
 January 20 – Battle of Yungay: Chile defeats the Peru–Bolivian Confederation, leading to the restoration of an independent Peru.
 January – The first parallax measurement of the distance to Alpha Centauri is published by Thomas Henderson.
 February 11 – The University of Missouri is established, becoming the first public university west of the Mississippi River.
 February 24 – William Otis receives a patent for the steam shovel.
 March 5 – Longwood University is founded in Farmville, Virginia.
 March 7 – Baltimore City College, the third public high school in the United States, is established in Baltimore, Maryland.
 March 9 – The Anti-Corn Law League is founded in Manchester, England. The Pastry War between France and Mexico ends.
 March 23 – 
An earthquake in the Kingdom of Burma kills more than 400 people and destroys three cities, as well as heavily damaging the capital at Ava.
The Boston Morning Post first records the use of "O.K." (oll korrect).
 March 26 – The first Henley Royal Regatta is held on the River Thames, in England.

April–June 
 April 9 – The world's first commercial electric telegraph line comes into operation, alongside the Great Western Railway line in England, from London Paddington station to West Drayton.
 April 19 – The Treaty of London establishes Belgium as a kingdom, with its independence and neutrality guaranteed by the great powers of Europe. Half of the Limburg province of Belgium is added to the Netherlands, giving rise to a Belgian Limburg and Dutch Limburg (the latter being joined (from September 5) to the German Confederation).
 April 24 – Boston University is established as the Newbury Biblical Institute in Vermont.
 May 7 – The Bedchamber Crisis begins in the United Kingdom, after Prime Minister Lord Melbourne announces his resignation.  Queen Victoria asks several MPs to form a new government, and they insist on the condition that the Queen dismiss several of her personal attendants, the ladies of the bedchamber, for political reasons.
 May 12 – Socialist activist Louis Auguste Blanqui and the Société des Saisons begin an uprising against the government of France.  The insurrection is suppressed, but not before 50 people are killed and 190 wounded.  Blanqui is imprisoned until 1848. 
 May 22 – Former British statesman Lord Durham, as President of the New Zealand Company, formally asks the British government for permission to colonize New Zealand, and to establish a colonial government under the sovereignty of the United Kingdom.  
 May 23 – Turkish troops cross the Euphrates River and invade Syria, but are defeated in battle in June. 
 June 3 – Destruction of opium at Humen begins, casus belli for Britain to open the 3-year First Opium War against Qing Dynasty China. A rapid rise in the sale of opium in China to over 40,000 chests (~) per annum results.  has caused the Chinese government to dispatch scholar-official Lin Zexu to Guangzhou to deal with the growing problem of opium addiction.
 June 22 – Louis Daguerre receives a patent for his camera (commercially available by September at the price of 400 francs).
 June 27 - The emperor of the Sikh Empire, Maharaja Ranjit Singh, dies at 58.

July–September 

 July 1
 Slaves aboard the Amistad rebel, and capture the ship.
 Abdülmecid I (1839–1861) succeeds Mahmud II (1808–1839) as Ottoman Emperor.
 July 23 – First Anglo-Afghan War – Battle of Ghazni: British forces capture the fortress city of Ghazni, Afghanistan.
 August 8 – The Fraternity of Beta Theta Pi is founded by John Reily Knox at Miami University.
 August 19 – The French government gives the daguerreotype "for the whole world".
 August 31 – The First Carlist War (Spain) ends with the Convenio de Vergara, also known as the Abrazo de Vergara ("the embrace in Vergara"; Bergara in Basque), between liberal general Baldomero Espartero, Count of Luchana and Carlist General Rafael Maroto.
 September 4 – Battle of Kowloon: British vessels open fire on Chinese war junks enforcing a food sales embargo on the British community in China in the first armed conflict of the First Opium War.

October–December 
 October 3 – A railway between Naples and Portici in the Kingdom of the Two Sicilies is inaugurated by King Ferdinand II of Bourbon as the first line in the Italian Peninsula.
 October 15 – Emir Abdelkader declares a jihad against the French.
 November 4 – Newport Rising: Between 5,000 and 10,000 Chartist sympathisers march on Newport, Monmouthshire, to liberate Chartist prisoners; around 22 are killed when troops fire on the crowd. This is the last large-scale armed civil rebellion against authority in mainland Britain and sees the most deaths.
 November 11 – The Virginia Military Institute is founded in Lexington, Virginia.
 November 17 – Giuseppe Verdi's first opera, Oberto, conte di San Bonifacio, opens in Milan.
 November 25 – A disastrous cyclone hits India with terrible winds and a giant 40-foot storm surge, wiping out the port city of Coringa; 300,000 people die.
 November 27 – The American Statistical Association is founded in Boston, Massachusetts.
 December 6 – The Whig Party (United States), at its first ever national convention, in Harrisburg, Pennsylvania, nominates former U.S. Army General William Henry Harrison to be its candidate for President of the United States in the 1840 election. Although Senator Henry Clay of Kentucky has received 103 of the 128 necessary votes on the first ballot, he obtains only 90 on the final vote, while Harrison gets 148. Former U.S. Senator John Tyler is unanimously nominated for vice president.
 December 26 – Heinola was granted town rights by Czar Nicholas I.

Date unknown 
 In the United States, the first state law permitting women to own property is passed in Jackson, Mississippi.
 The United Kingdom of Great Britain and Ireland, backed by the Russian Empire and the Austrian Empire, compels July Monarchy France to abandon Muhammad Ali of Egypt, and forces him to return Syria and Arabia to the Ottoman Empire.
 Tanzimat starts in the Ottoman Empire.
 Emperor Minh Mạng renames Việt Nam to Đại Nam.
 Michael Faraday publishes "Experimental Researches in Electricity", clarifying the true nature of electricity.
 Charles Goodyear vulcanizes rubber.
 An archaeological excavation on Copán begins.
 Khalid bin Saud Al Suad usurps the throne from Faisal bin Turki bin Abdullah Al Saud, who assumed power of Nejd in 1834, and is sent to Cairo as prisoner. Omar bin Ofaysan, the Amir Faisal's governor in the Eastern Province seeks asylum in Bahrain, but Khalid the pretender demands his surrender and the surrender of the fort at Dammam; then under the control of the Al Khalifa of Bahrain.
 Khorshid Pasha vows to attack Bahrain to exert Egyptian rule over Bahrain, but his attack is prevented after Shaikh Abdulla bin Ahmed of Bahrain pays tribute.
 A quarrel broke out between the Chief of Abu Dhabi of the Beniyas tribe, Shaikh Khalifa bin Shakboot, and the fugitives who settled there after their departure from Bahrain, the Al Binali tribe. Under the command of their leader, Isa bin Tureef Al Binali, they relocate to Kenn Island where they exercise depredations over the Bahrain and other Gulf vessels. Their motive is to restore their belongings which they abandoned upon leaving Bahrain.
 Valley Falls Company, as predecessor of Berkshire Hathaway, a conglomerate and holdings business in United States, was founded in Rhode Island.
 Chattanooga, Tennessee,  is incorporated as a town.
 Galveston, Texas, is incorporated.
 Episcopal High School (Alexandria, Virginia) is founded in Alexandria, Virginia, as the first high school in Virginia.

Births

January–June 

 January 2 – Gustave Trouvé, French electrical engineer, inventor (d. 1902)
 January 8 – William A. Clark, American politician, entrepreneur (d. 1925)
 January 9 – John Knowles Paine, American composer (d. 1906)
 January 19 – Paul Cézanne, French painter (d. 1906)
 January 26 – Rachel Lloyd, American chemist (d. 1900)
 February 6 – Caroline Testman, Danish women's rights activist  (d. 1919)
 February 11
 Josiah Willard Gibbs, American physicist, chemist (d. 1903)
 Almon Brown Strowger, American telecommunications engineer (d. 1902)
 February 18 – Pascual Cervera y Topete, Spanish admiral (d. 1909)
 February 22 – Francis Pharcellus Church, American editor, publisher (d. 1906)
 March 3 – Jamsetji Tata, Indian Parsi businessman (d. 1904)
 March 8 – Josephine Cochrane, American inventor of the first commercially successful dishwasher (d. 1913)
 March 15 – Daniel Ridgway Knight, American artist (d. 1924)
 March 16
 Sully Prudhomme, French poet, critic, Nobel Prize laureate (d. 1907)
 John Butler Yeats, Irish artist (d. 1922)
 March 21 – Modest Mussorgsky, Russian composer (d. 1881)
 March 23 – Julius von Hann, Austrian meteorologist (The father of modern meteorology) (d. 1921)
 March 25
 Carlo Pellegrini, Italian caricaturist (d. 1889)
 Marianne Hainisch, founder, leader of the Austrian women's movement (d. 1936)
 March 27 – John Ballance, 14th Premier of New Zealand (d. 1893)
 April 3 – Karl, Freiherr von Prel, German philosopher (d. 1899)
 April 8 – Belle L. Pettigrew, American teacher, missionary (d. 1912)
 April 12 – Nikolay Przhevalsky, Russian explorer (d. 1888)
 April 16 – Antonio Starabba, Marchese di Rudinì, 12th Prime Minister of Italy (d. 1908)
 April 30
 Floriano Peixoto, 2nd President of Brazil (d. 1895)
 Yoshitoshi, Japanese artist (d. 1892)
 May 14 – Frederic W. Tilton, American educator and 7th Principal of Phillips Academy in Andover, Massachusetts (d. 1918)
 May 21  – Mary of the Passion, French Roman Catholic religious sister, missionary, and blessed (d. 1904)
 June 1  – Abdyl Frashëri, Albanian politician (d.1892)
 June 10 – Ludvig Holstein-Ledreborg, Prime Minister of Denmark (d. 1912)
 June 17 – Arthur Tooth, Anglican clergyman prosecuted for Ritualist practices in the 1870s (d. 1931)
 June 21 – Machado de Assis, Brazilian author (d. 1908)

July–December 

 July - Baba Jaimal Singh, Founder of Radha Soami Satsang Beas (d. 1903)
 July 6 – Édouard Pottier, French admiral (d. 1903)
 July 8 – John D. Rockefeller, American industrialist, philanthropist (d. 1937)
 July 17 – Ephraim Shay, American inventor of the Shay locomotive (d. 1916)
 July 18 – James Surtees Phillpotts, English author (d. 1930)
 July 28 – Isabelle Gatti de Gamond, Italo-Belgian educationalist, feminist, and politician (d. 1905)
 July 31 – Ignacio Andrade, 37th President of Venezuela (d. 1925)
 August 4 – Walter Pater, English essayist, critic (d. 1894)
 August 8 – Nelson A. Miles, American general (d. 1925)
 August 15 – Antonín Petrof, Czech piano maker (d. 1915)
 September 2 – Henry George, American writer, politician, and political economist (d. 1897)
 September 7 – Patricio Montojo y Pasarón, Spanish admiral (d. 1917)
 September 10 – Charles Sanders Peirce, American philosopher, logician, mathematician, and scientist (d. 1914)
 September 12 –  Mary H. Graves, American minister, literary editor, writer (d. 1908)
 October 2 – Oscar de Négrier, French general (d. 1913)
 October 9
 Georges Leclanché, French electrical engineer, inventor (d. 1882)
 Winfield Scott Schley, American admiral (d. 1911)
 October 11 – Jeanne Merkus, Dutch deaconess, guerilla soldier, and political activist (d. 1897)
 October 30 – Alfred Sisley, French Impressionist landscape painter (d. 1899)
 November 1 – Pál Luthár, Slovene writer in Hungary (d. 1919)
 November 12 – Frank Furness, American architect, soldier (d. 1912)
 November 18 – Emil Škoda, Czech engineer, industrialist (d. 1900)
 November 20 – Christian Wilberg, German painter (d. 1882)
 November 30 – Catherine Amanda Coburn, American journalist, newspaper editor (d. 1913)
 December 5 – George Armstrong Custer, American cavalry officer (d. 1876)
 December 7 – Sir Redvers Buller, British general, Victoria Cross recipient (d. 1908)
 December 21 – Sherman Conant, American soldier and politician (d. 1890)

Date unknown 
 Avis Crocombe, English cook at Audley End House

Deaths

January–June 

 January 24 – Michele Cachia, Maltese architect, military engineer (b. 1760)
 February 7 – Karl August Nicander, Swedish poet (b. 1799)
 February 8 – William Williams, English politician (b. 1774)
 February 10 – Pedro Romero, Spanish torero (b. 1754)
 February 12 – Moulvi Syed Qudratullah, Bengali judge (b. 1750)
 March 2 – Charlotte Napoléone Bonaparte, niece of Napoleon I of France (b. 1802)
 March 20 – Caspar Voght, German businessman (b. 1752)
 April 1 – Benjamin Pierce, American politician (b. 1757)
 April 2 – Hezekiah Niles, American editor, publisher (b. 1777)
 April 4 – Queen Kaahumanu II of Hawaii
 April 11 – John Galt, Scottish novelist (b. 1779)
 April 22
 Denis Davydov, Russian general, poet (b. 1784)
 Samuel Smith (Maryland politician), American politician (b. 1752)
 May 11
 Thomas Cooper, American political philosopher (b. 1759)
 William Farquhar, First British Resident and Commandant of colonial Singapore (b. 1774)
 May 17 – Archibald Alison, Scottish author (b. 1757)
 June 23 – Lady Hester Stanhope, English archaeologist (b. 1776)
 June 27 – Ranjit Singh, Maharaja of The Punjab (Sikh Empire) (b. 1780)

July–December 

 July 1 – Mahmud II, Ottoman sultan (b. 1785)
 July 8 – Fernando Sor, Spanish guitarist, composer (b. 1778)
 July 15 – Winthrop Mackworth Praed, English politician, poet (b. 1802)
 July 16 – Chief Bowles, Cherokee leader (b. ~1756)
 July 19 – Maurice de Guérin, French poet (b. 1810)
 August 10 – Sir John St Aubyn, 5th Baronet, English fossil collector (b. 1758)
 August 22 – Benjamin Lundy, American abolitionist (b. 1789)
 August 28 – William Smith, English geologist, cartographer (b. 1769)
 September 10 – James Maitland, 8th Earl of Lauderdale, Scottish politician (b. 1759)
 September 29 – Friedrich Mohs, German geologist, mineralogist (b. 1773)
 October 6 – William Light, British Army colonel, first Surveyor-General of South Australia (b. 1786)
 October 11 – Leonor de Almeida Portugal, 4th Marquise of Alorna, Portuguese painter, poet (b. 1750)
 November 15 – William Murdoch, Scottish inventor (b. 1754)
 December 3 – Frederick VI, King of Denmark, ex-King of Norway (b. 1768)
 December 4 – John Leamy, Irish–American merchant (b. 1757)
 December 15 – Ignaz Aurelius Fessler, Hungarian court councillor, minister to Alexander I (b. 1756)
 December 26 – Laurent Jean François Truguet, French admiral (b. 1752)

References